El Casamiento de Laucha is a 1977 Argentine film directed by Enrique Dawi.

Cast
 Marta Albertini
 Max Berliner
 Amalia Bernabé
 Pablo Cumo Jr.
 Ulises Dumont
 Coco Fossati
 Alberto Irizar
 Luis Landriscina
 Noemí Laserre
 Malvina Pastorino
 Pedro Quartucci
 Romualdo Quiroga
 Luis Sandrini
 Mario Sapag
 Osvaldo Terranova

External links
 

1977 films
Argentine comedy films
1970s Spanish-language films
Films directed by Enrique Dawi
1970s Argentine films